Fox Valley Ice Arena is a public skating facility offering basic to advanced skating lessons for both figure skating and hockey. In addition, it is home to the Chicago Steel of the United States Hockey League.  It contains two rinks: one measures 200' x 85' (the size of a National Hockey League rink) and the other 200' x 100' (an international-size rink). The arena is also an official rink partner of the Chicago Blackhawks. Fox Valley Ice Arena has a full service fitness facility on the premise, and an award-winning restaurant, Chelios Pub and Grill.

Hockey tenants
The Chicago Steel moved to the Fox Valley Ice Arena in 2015, having previously played at the Edge Ice Arena in Bensenville, Illinois since their inception in 2000. They added several new features to the rink, including a new scoreboard in the main NHL rink, new will call area, and renovated the back of the rink with office facilities, etc. Prior to the renovation of the rink, it was used for home games of the Chicago Bluesmen of Roller Hockey International and the Chicago Hitmen of the North American Hockey League and North American 3 Hockey League.

External links
 Fox Valley Ice Arena Official site

Geneva, Illinois
Buildings and structures in Kane County, Illinois
Indoor ice hockey venues in Illinois
Chicago Bluesmen
Sports in Kane County, Illinois